Follow Me, Scoundrels is a 1964 East German historical adventure film directed by Ralf Kirsten and starring Manfred Krug, Monika Woytowicz, and Fred Düren.

The film's sets were designed by the art directors Jochen Keller and Hans Poppe.

Cast

References

Bibliography

External links
 

1964 films
1960s historical adventure films
German historical adventure films
East German films
1960s German-language films
Films set in the 1730s
Films set in Prussia
German swashbuckler films
Films based on German novels
1960s German films